Ysa Ferrer (born 4 June 1972 in Oran, Algeria) is a French actress and singer.

Biography
Ysa Ferrer was born in Oran (Algeria) to an Egyptian father and a French mother. She was a teenager when she started to work for a local radio station in France. Very quickly, she moved to Paris and after only a few auditions, she was chosen to play one of the leading roles in a popular TV series. At the same time she also started to act in movies for the cinema.

However Ysa knew that her real love was music. During her days off she worked on demos. In 1995, she signed a deal with Universal Music France. Two albums were released : "D'essences naturelles" in 1995 and "Kamikaze", which contained her hit single "Mes rêves", followed in 1998.

After several singles ("Mourir pour elles" – EMI Records and "Made in Japan"- East-West France), she released a dance version of Goran Bregovic's song "Ederlezi". The track was a hit in Sweden (top 20) and all eastern Europe (Germany and Russia especially).

In 2007, she founded her own production company, Lovarium Production, and started to work on her own. Since then she has released several hits taken from her third album "Imaginaire Pur" ("On fait l'amour", which contains a sample from Rondo Veneziano, "Sens Interdit", "Last Zoom") .

Writer, composer and singer, Ysa Ferrer is regarded as the French "Kylie Minogue". Her dance/electro style, called "Pop Kosmic" is very popular in France and Russia especially in the LGBTQ community where she is considered as a true icon.

"After the release of my latest album and his unexpected success in the eastern countries in particular, I decided to work harder than ever. The last two years have been intense, productive and full of emotion. I realized how beautiful my fans are and I wanted to meet them again and again", says Ysa Ferrer.

In 2010, Ysa released "French Kiss" produced by Chew Fu. Once again the single was an instant success in Russia.

Ysa Ferrer's fourth album "Ultra Ferrer" was released in October, just days before her "Paradoxal Show" premiere, on 16 October 2010 in the legendary Parisian venue "Bobino".

Discography

Albums 

 1995 : D'essences naturelles
 1998 : Kamikaze
 2008 : Imaginaire pur
 2008 : Kamikaze 2.0 (Reissue)
 2009 : Imaginaire pur reloaded (Reissue)
 2010 : Ultra Ferrer
 2014 : Sanguine
 2018 : X Y Z

Singles
 1995 : À coups de Typ-Ex
 1996 : 109 en 95
 1996 : Ne me chasse pas
 1997 : Mes rêves
 1998 : Les yeux dans les yeux
 1998 : Tu sais, I know
 1999 : Flash in the Night
 2000 : Mourir pour elles
 2003 : Made in Japan
 2004 : Ederlezi (feat. Richi M)
 2008 : To Bi Or Not To Bi
 2008 : On fait l'amour
 2009 : Sens interdit
 2009 : Last Zoom
 2010 : French Kiss
 2010 : Hands Up
 2011 : Je Vois 2011 : Brille 2012 : Pom Pom Girl 2014 : POP 2014 : Folle De Vouloir Continuer 2014 : Made in Japan Remix (feat. Belka) 2015 : Où êtes-vous Mylène ? 2015 : God Save The Queen 2015 : D'un Peu Live 2015 : No Time To Cook 2015 : Qui Sait 2018 : Née Sous X 2018 : La Moitie de Moi-Meme 2019 : Vivre 2019 : Follow Me 2020 : Je sortirai grandie 2020 : Demande à la pousière 2021 : To The World 2021 : Tout Un PoèmeDVD
 2009 : Ysa Ferrer à la Nouvelle Ève''

Others 
 Gay icon

External links
 Official Site
 Official Store
 Official MySpace
 Official Facebook
 Official Twitter

French film actresses
Algerian emigrants to France
1972 births
Living people
French people of Spanish descent
Pieds-Noirs
People from Oran
French television actresses
21st-century French singers
21st-century French women singers